Batrachedrodes supercincta is a moth of the family Momphidae.  It was first described by Lord Walsingham in 1907. It is endemic to the Hawaiian island of Maui.

The larvae probably feed on a fern species.

References

External links

Momphidae
Endemic moths of Hawaii
Moths described in 1907